Martin Šimeček (born 29 July 1967 in Příbram) is a Czech retired competitive ice dancer. With partner Kateřina Mrázová, he is a multiple Czech national champion. They placed 10th at the 1992 Winter Olympics (at which they competed for Czechoslovakia), 8th at the 1994 Winter Olympics, and 13th at the 1998 Winter Olympics. They retired from competitive skating following the 1998 World Figure Skating Championships.

Before teaming up with Mrázová, Šimeček competed with Andrea Juklova internationally for Czechoslovakia at the World Figure Skating Championships and European Figure Skating Championships. Their highest placement was 7th at the 1989 Europeans.

Results

With Mrázová

With Juklová

References

 Skatabase: 1990s Ice Dancing Olympics Results

External links
 Figure skating corner profile

Czech male ice dancers
Czechoslovak male ice dancers
Figure skaters at the 1992 Winter Olympics
Figure skaters at the 1994 Winter Olympics
Figure skaters at the 1998 Winter Olympics
Olympic figure skaters of the Czech Republic
Olympic figure skaters of Czechoslovakia
Universiade medalists in figure skating
Sportspeople from Příbram
1967 births
Living people
Universiade gold medalists for the Czech Republic
Universiade silver medalists for the Czech Republic
Competitors at the 1993 Winter Universiade
Competitors at the 1995 Winter Universiade